Freddy Flores Knistoff is a painter and writer born in Viña del Mar, Chile in 1948. He has lived in Amsterdam since 1985.

Flores Knistoff is still active in both painting and producing artist's books. He also composes experimental poetry and since 1993 has published with Hybriden-Verlag of Berlin directed by Hartmut Andryczuk. He is strongly connected to the international movement FLUXUS.

In recent years, he has exhibited in Brussels (2007), London (2012), New York City (2008 and 2012), Pennsylvania (2012) and Oxford (2014).

He founded the Collective Automatic Painting of Amsterdam in 1991 and through this movement influenced other artists in the use of automatic painting. 
Flores Knistoff is also an active member of the Phases movement that coalesced around Édouard Jaguer and involved Roberto Matta.

Exhibitions 
He has exhibited alongside the following artists:
 1993: Cobra exhibition Museum Amstelle, Amstelveen, Amsterdam, the Netherlands
Catalogue Cobra 1948-1951 collection J Karel van Stuijvenberg: Karel Appel, Asger Jorn, Jean Michel Atlan, Constant Nieuwenhuis, Jacques Doucet, Lucebert, Carl-Henning Pedersen, Karl Otto Götz
 1993: Latino América y el Surrealismo, Bochum Museum, Germany
with Rufino Tamayo, Wifredo Lam, Wolfgang Paalen, André Masson, Eugenio Granell, Roberto Matta, Hervé Télémaque
 1994: Museum of Modern Art, Zielona Góra, Poland
with Karl Otto Götz, Eugenio Granell, Edouard Jaguer, Conroy Maddox, Jacques Lacomblez, Yo Yoshitome
 1994: Phases, Brittany, France
with Enrico Baj, Edouard Jaguer, Otto Gotz, Pierre Alechinsky, Christian Dotremont
 1997: Phases, São Paulo, Brazil
with Jef Golyscheff, Flavio Ciro, Victor Chab, Yo Yoshitome, New CoBra Amsterdam
 1998: Hans und Lote Lesen, Hannover Germany
with Hartmut Andryczuk, Gerhild Ebel, Jurgen O. Olbrich, Emmet Willians, Pierre Garnier, Ann Noel
 1999: KVP II Parasiten, Hannover, Germany
with Hartmut Andryczuk, Dietmar Becker, Gerhild Ebel, Pierre Garnier, Emmet Willians, Ottfried Zielke, Wolf Rosenthal
 2000: Phases, Arras, France
with Pierre Alechinsky, Enrico Baj, Raoul Hausmann, Paul Jenkins, Konrad Klapheck, Carl-Henning Pedersen, Carl Buchheister
 2005: Phases, Santiago, Chile
with Roberto Matta, Wifredo Lam, Édouard Jaguer, Enrico Baj, Pierre Alechinsky, Sergio d'Angelo, Victor Brauner

References

External links
 Homepage
 Oxford Benezit Dictionary of Artists
 
 Phases at French Wikipedia 

1948 births
Living people
20th-century Chilean painters
Chilean male artists
21st-century Chilean painters
21st-century male artists
Chilean male painters
Federico Santa María Technical University alumni
Male painters
20th-century Chilean male artists